Greeley County Courthouse may refer to:

Greeley County Courthouse (Kansas), Tribune, Kansas
Old Greeley County Courthouse (Kansas), Tribune, Kansas
Greeley County Courthouse (Nebraska), Greeley Center, Nebraska